Xiphochaeta is a genus of South American plants in the Vernonieae tribe within the daisy family.

Species
The only known species is Xiphochaeta aquatica, native to Peru, Bolivia, Brazil, Venezuela, Guyana, Suriname, and French Guiana.

References

Monotypic Asteraceae genera
Flora of South America
Vernonieae
Taxa named by Eduard Friedrich Poeppig